Jin Koh (born December 26, 1980) is an entrepreneur and investor who was born in Malaysia and is now a citizen of the United States and a Tokyo resident. He is best known as the founder and chief executive officer of the sustainable fashion company Original Stitch and the body intelligence company Bodygram. He also founded Splashtop Japan, a remote-desktop software company, which he expanded into the Japanese enterprise market.

Early life

Jin Koh was born on December 26, 1980, in Malaysia. He moved to the heart of Silicon Valley, San Jose, California, at the age of 18. Koh attended the University of California, Berkeley and majored in Bachelor of Arts in Legal Studies.

Career

Koh's career has included several successful ventures in the tech industry. He has made various investments in other companies through his investment funds particularly in the areas of artificial intelligence, enterprise software as a service, blockchain and web3, and healthcare.

ShareSpace

In 2001, at the age of 19, Koh founded ShareSpace, a collaboration application company that allowed companies to easily share large files through a web-based platform. His success was featured on the front page of a Japanese newspaper that reported on his creation of a browser-based file sharing application. This news caught the attention of ASAHI Net, a major ISP in Japan that was looking for a "killer app" to encourage businesses to switch to broadband services. Asahi Net reached out to Koh to explore the possibility of bundling ShareSpace as this app to accelerate broadband adoption among businesses.

In 2003, Asahi Net made an offer to acquire ShareSpace, so Koh dropped out of UC Berkeley at the age of 21 to join Asahi Net in Tokyo following the acquisition. The company rebranded ShareSpace to AsaOne, which remains a popular service to this day. Asahi Net was at one point ranked as the #1 broadband ISP for small businesses in Japan.

Nuvoiz

In 2004, Koh was the founder of Nuvoiz in Mountain View, California, a R&D arm of a Japanese WiMAX carrier. 

At Nuvoiz, he invented Wi-Fi roaming and NAT traversal for mobile devices, which was granted US Patent #US8130760 on March 6, 2012.

In January 2007, Nuvoiz launched the company's SoftPhone and VoIP Network Controller at the DEMO '07 conference in Palm Desert, California. Executive producer, Chris Shipley was thrilled to have Koh launch Nuvoiz's first products at DEMO '07.

StartForce

Koh founded StartForce in 2007 with $3 million in venture capital funding. StartForce was a browser-based computer that allowed users to access their desktops, applications, and documents from any device with a browser.

StartForce offered massive storage space, office productivity, desktops, emails, messaging, and file sharing apps for free to anyone in the world, which would typically cost $3,000-$4,000, but StartForce was able to offer it for free because it was built on a browser with a web SaaS architecture. The idea of rebuilding computer desktops and office application entirely in a Web application was highly disruptive because it brought cost of ownership down to a fraction. Despite the growth, StartForce was never able to monetize and struggled to keep up with the significant costs of hosting many free virtual desktops. Businesses continued to rely on proprietary legacy applications that could not run on the internet, making it difficult for StartForce to generate revenue. Koh was considering pivoting the company to charge consumers a subscription fee for a more premium virtual desktop experience, but investors were not willing to fund the pivot. Amid the Lehman shock in 2008, against Koh's direction, the investors decided to stop funding the company and began looking for a buyer. StartForce was eventually sold to ZeroDesktop in San Mateo, California, at a deeply discounted value, leading to a loss of capital for the investors and rendering Koh's founding shares worthless. ZeroDesktop took over the intellectual properties and subsequently fired Koh from the management team.

Splashtop

Koh met Mark Lee, the founder of Splashtop, in 2008 and subsequently joined the company in 2009 as VP of Mobile Solutions. Splashtop enables users to remotely access or remotely support computers from desktop and mobile devices. He headed up its Japan operations to build a new product line for enterprise customers. In 2011, Koh launched Splashtop Japan with the goal of expanding the company's reach in the Japanese market. Despite initial challenges, Koh was able to build strong sales channels and partnerships in Japan, eventually leading to significant growth for Splashtop Japan.

Koh’s first hire was Yoshiaki Mizuno, his longtime friend who lives in Tokyo. However, the early years of Splashtop Japan were marked by significant losses, as it was difficult for the company to gain the trust and support of Japanese customers without case studies and established sales channels. To turn the situation around, Koh focused on building strong sales channels for Splashtop Japan and partnering with key players in the market. Through these efforts, he was able to win the first few big enterprise customers as case studies, which helped to establish the company's credibility and pave the way for future success. Today, Splashtop has secured sales distributions with all three major telecom carriers in Japan, Softbank, Docomo, and KDDI, and has thousands of businesses as paying customers. The company has also secured more than $50 million in funding, which helped it to achieve status.

Original Stitch

Koh is the founder of Original Stitch, a sustainable fashion company based in San Francisco, that utilizes on-demand manufacturing to create zero waste clothing. Koh was shocked to discover that clothing was one of the largest polluters in the world. This realization led him to start Original Stitch in 2015 with the goal of finding a solution to this issue through sustainable fashion. In 2016, Koh raised $1.1 million from Inspire Ventures, NTT Docomo, and private investor Bill Lohse.

One of Koh's key innovations was the idea of allowing customers to fully customize their clothing, from the design to the fit and sizing. This idea proved wildly successful, and Original Stitch became one of the best-selling custom-made clothing brands online, even without any retail stores or sales staff. In addition to offering custom clothing to individuals, Koh also opened up the Original Stitch platform to other brands, partnering with companies like Pokémon, One Piece, Disney, and Doraemon to offer custom clothing options to their millions of fans.

Koh is known as a leader in D2C Direct-to-consumer in mass customization apparel, combining technology, the internet, on-demand manufacturing, and sustainability into a successful business model. In 2019, Japanese apparel company World made an offer to acquire a majority stake in Original Stitch in order to further advance Koh’s vision of sustainable fashion.

In 2019, Original Stitch partnered with Pokémon to create customized Pokémon shirts, which are popular with Pokémon fans. Customized face masks, aprons, and bandanas can also be made from the same Pokémon patterns. Customers can select any of the 151 Pokémon patterns. In December 2022, Original Stitch announced it would begin offering the Japanese manga series One Piece to create custom clothing.

Bodygram

In 2019, Koh founded Bodygram, a body intelligence company that combines artificial intelligence and motion capture technology to provide actionable body insights.

Koh conceived of a mobile body scanner that could be accessed through a software app on any phone. He assembled a team of engineers and began working on the architecture for Bodygram, a free app that allows users to take just two photos of their body and receive 30 useful data points about their body. The app has been highly successful, ranking as the #1 app in the healthcare/fitness category on multiple occasions and earning numerous awards as one of the most important companies of the year.

Koh has grown Bodygram from a small start-up to a company of 50 people and has raised $30 million in funding. In 2022, he has also promoted his long-time friend Rei Aiba to the position of CEO, allowing Jin to focus on product development and innovation. Together, Jin and Rei continue to grow Bodygram's user base in both the B2B and B2C sectors, with the goal of empowering people with actionable insights about their own bodies and helping them form a deeper understanding and connection with their own physical health.

In November 2020, Bodygram partnered with Selery Co., a Japanese manufacturer of uniforms, to use Bodygram in their operations to reduce the costs and improve the efficiency of their manufacturing process. The exercise of taking customer’s measurements using Bodygram is expected to see an 85% drop in Selery's operational costs. 

Bodygram can be linked with Apple's Health app to share waist circumference and body fat percentage. A graph shows changes so users can check their health risk on a daily basis.

Ballroom Dancing

In addition to his career in the technology industry, Koh is also an accomplished Latin American ballroom dancer. Koh was honored by chairman Motoko Inagawa for his performance at the 43rd Japan International Dance Championship on June 19, 2022.

Achievements

Koh has received numerous recognitions and awards throughout his career, including being selected as the winner of Demo '07 and Tie50 Top Silicon Valley Startups, and being featured in CNBC NASDAQ Market Site.

 Winner of Demo '07, a prestigious event that showcases innovative new products and technologies (2007)
 Winner of Tie50 Top Silicon Valley Startups (2015)
 Featured in CNBC NASDAQ Market Site alongside Jon Fortt (2017)
 Nikkei X Trendy ranked Bodygram as the 5th among the Top 100 companies shaping the future (2021)
 Honored by chairman Motoko Inagawa for his performance at the 43rd Japan International Dance Championship (2022)

Patents

Koh is the inventor and owner of 15 approved U.S. patents. He is fluent in American English, Mandarin Chinese, and Japanese language.

 Session initiation and maintenance while roaming - US8130760B2
 Systems and methods for full body measurements extraction - US10321728B1
 Methods and systems for customized garment design generation - US9949519B2
 Methods and systems for automatic generation of massive training data sets from 3D models for training deep learning networks - US10489683B1
 Methods of determining measurements for custom clothing manufacture - US9936754B2
 Methods and systems for generating 3D datasets to train deep learning networks for measurements estimation - US11010896B2
 Systems and methods for weight measurement from user photos using deep learning networks - US10962404B2
 Methods and systems for height estimation from a 2D image using augmented reality - US10636158B1
 Dress shirt with emoji pattern - USD838938S1
 Dress shirt with kimono pattern - USD834288S1
 Systems and methods for full body measurements extraction - WO2019204235A1

See also
 List of entrepreneurs

References

External links

 Jin Koh at Linkedin

1980 births
American people of Malaysian descent
American ballroom dancers
21st-century American businesspeople
Living people